Mac Paul Wenskunas (June 8, 1922 – August 3, 1957) was an American football player and coach.  He served as the head football coach at North Dakota Agricultural College—now known as North Dakota State University—from 1950 to 1953, compiling a record of 11–21–1.  A native of Georgetown, Illinois, Wenskunas played college football as a center at the University of Illinois at Urbana–Champaign.  He lettered for the Illinois Fighting Illini in 1942, 1945, and 1946.  He was captain of the 1946 Illinois Fighting Illini football team, which won  the Big Ten Conference and the 1947 Rose Bowl.  Wenskunas died in a car crash on August 3, 1957, near Boody, Illinois.

Head coaching record

References

External links
 

1922 births
1957 deaths
American football centers
Illinois Fighting Illini football players
North Dakota State Bison football coaches
People from Georgetown, Illinois
Players of American football from Illinois
Road incident deaths in Illinois